James Matthew Neil (born May 15, 1968) is an American rower who competed at the 1992 Summer Olympics in the men's coxed four. In a team with Teo Bielefeld, Sean Hall, Jack Rusher, and Tim Evans as cox, he came fourth.

References

External links
 
 
 

1968 births
Living people
American male rowers
Olympic rowers of the United States
Rowers at the 1992 Summer Olympics
World Rowing Championships medalists for the United States
Pan American Games medalists in rowing
Pan American Games gold medalists for the United States
Rowers at the 1995 Pan American Games
Rowers at the 1999 Pan American Games
Medalists at the 1999 Pan American Games